Guzzle may refer to:

Guzzle (PHP library), a HTTP client library
Guzzle (Transformers), a Transformers character
Guzzle, a 1990 album by Hoss